Sustainable regional development is the application of sustainable development at a regional, rather than local, national or global level.  It differs to regional development per se, as the latter is a term used more generally to describe economic development that emphasises the alleviation of regional disparities.  While regional development has an economic and equity emphasis, sustainable regional development seeks to incorporate ecological concerns.

Sustainable regional development has particular currency in Australia, where the Institute for Sustainable Regional Development has been established (1997) for the purpose of developing integrated, multi- and inter-disciplinary strategies for environmental and socio-economic change in regional Australia.

References

Sustainable design
Sustainable development
Urban planning
Regional